Corpus is a Canadian dance company whose work often combines humour with dance.  Besides major productions, they often perform in schools, and are co-creators of the Treehouse TV series 4 Square.  They have performed thousands of shows internationally since their founding in 1997 by David Danzon and Sylvie Bouchard.

Awards
 Dora Mavor Moore Award nomination: Outstanding Choreography for Rendez-vous (2000)
 Dora Mavor Moore Award nomination: Outstanding Performance for Rendez-vous  (2000)
 Dora Mavor Moore Award nomination: Outstanding Choreography for Nuit blanche (2002)
 Dora Mavor Moore Award nomination: Outstanding Choreography for Les moutons (2003)
 Féderation Culturelle Canadienne Française Winner: Prix Hommage for Arts (2002)
 IV Games of la francophonie Gold Medal Winner (2001)

References

Dance companies in Canada